The 1979–80 St. Louis Blues season was the 13th in franchise history.  It involved the team returning to the NHL Playoffs for the first time in three seasons, following the team's 34-34-12 record during the regular-season, good for 80 points.  The season started the team's run of 25 consecutive seasons of playoff appearances, a record for any non-Original Six NHL franchise.

Offseason

Regular season

Final standings

Schedule and results

Playoffs

Player statistics

Regular season
Scoring

Goaltending

Playoffs
Scoring

Goaltending

Awards and records

Transactions

Draft picks
St. Louis's draft picks at the 1979 NHL Entry Draft held at the Queen Elizabeth Hotel in Montreal, Quebec.

Farm teams

See also
1979–80 NHL season

References

External links

St. Louis Blues seasons
St. Louis
St. Louis
St. Louis Blues
St. Louis Blues